Abraham Guem (born 29 April 1999) is a middle-distance runner from South Sudan who specializes in the 1500 metres.

In April 2021, he set a new personal best and national record for the 1500 metres of 3:42.99 at the Komazawa Olympic Park Stadium in Tokyo. He was selected for the 2020 Tokyo Olympics and was given the honour of being a flag bearer for his nation in the opening ceremony.

References

External links
 

1999 births
Living people
Athletes (track and field) at the 2020 Summer Olympics
Olympic athletes of South Sudan
South Sudanese male middle-distance runners